This article summarizes the activity of Egyptian football during the 2022–23 season, including domestic and international tournaments for senior and youth teams.

National teams

Men

Senior

Youth 
U17

U20

U23

Women

Senior

Youth 
U20

Leagues

Premier League

Second Division

Continental competitions

CAF Champions League 
Al Ahly

Zamalek

CAF Confederation Cup 
Future

Pyramids

International competitions

Notes

References 

2022–23 in Egyptian football